Viviparus carinifer is an extinct species of freshwater snail with an operculum, an aquatic gastropod mollusk in the family Viviparidae, the river snails. It lived between the Bathonian and Bartonian epochs; although it may have persisted into the Oligocene.

V. carinifer is often found preserved in Purbeck Marble, although it has also been found in Oxfordshire and Gloucestershire.

References

Viviparidae
Prehistoric gastropods